Rebecca Morrison (born 22 August 1996) is a Scottish curler from Glasgow. She currently skips her own team out of Stirling. The team won the 2022 Scottish Curling Championships in Dumfries.

Career
Rebecca Morrison's national curling career has been closely intertwined with that of the Team GB nine-player squad. In being part of this squad, she skipped Team GB to the Euro Super Series championship in 2019. She later formed her current squad, with two of the other three members previous being on the team (the only person not is lead Sophie Jackson). Team Morrison, competing with third/vice-skip Gina Aitken, second Sophie Sinclair, and lead Sophie Jackson, won the 2022 Scottish Curling Championships which qualified them for the 2022 World Women's Curling Championship in Prince George. They were selected over Team Muirhead who did not compete at the 2022 Scottish Championships because of the proximity in time to the 2022 Olympic Winter Games. Unfortunately, Team Morrison was forced to withdraw from the 2022 World Championship after four of the five players on the team tested positive for COVID-19 leaving only one curler eligible to curl with Morrison and Fay Henderson testing positive before the start of the tournament, dropping team Morrison down to three players including the alternate and leaving them without their skip. On 20 March 2022, two more members of the team tested positive forcing Team Morrison to withdraw.

Personal life
Morrison is a student athlete and curling coach.

References

External links

Living people
1996 births
Scottish female curlers
Curlers from Glasgow
Sportspeople from Bristol
Scottish curling coaches